Strain is an unincorporated community in Richland Township, Washington County, Arkansas, United States. It is located between Fayetteville and Elkins. The community consists of a small number of homes located around a road junction near the Middle Fork White River.

A post office called Strain was established in 1884, and remained in operation until 1888.

References

Unincorporated communities in Washington County, Arkansas
Unincorporated communities in Arkansas